António Cândido, or in Brazilian Portuguese Antônio Cândido is a double-barreled masculine first name.

 Antonio Candido (literary critic), pen-name of Antônio Cândido de Mello e Souza, Brazilian literary critic
 António Cândido Gonçalves Crespo, Brazilian-born Portuguese poet

Portuguese masculine given names